Megachile laguniana is a species of bee in the family Megachilidae. It was described by Mitchell in 1937.

References

Laguniana
Insects described in 1937